Orlando Luz and Rafael Matos were the defending champions but chose not to compete.

Diego Hidalgo and Cristian Rodríguez won the title after defeating Francisco Cerúndolo and Camilo Ugo Carabelli 6–2, 6–0 in the final.

Seeds

Draw

References

External links
 Main draw

Challenger Concepción - Doubles